Agaraea santaris is a moth of the family Erebidae. It was described by William Schaus in 1920. It is found in Guatemala.

References

Moths described in 1920
Phaegopterina
Moths of Central America